High-performance thin-layer chromatography (HPTLC) is an enhanced form of thin-layer chromatography (TLC). A number of enhancements can be made to the basic method of thin-layer chromatography to automate the different steps, to increase the resolution achieved, and to allow more accurate quantitative measurements.

Automation is useful to overcome the uncertainty in droplet size and position when the sample is applied to the TLC plate by hand.  One approach to automation has been the use of piezoelectric devices and inkjet printers for applying the sample.

The spot capacity (analogous to peak capacity in HPLC) can be increased by developing the plate with two different solvents, using two-dimensional chromatography. The procedure begins with development of sample loaded plate with first solvent. After removing it, the plate is rotated 90° and developed with a second solvent.

Instrumentation 
An example of an instrument for HPTLC is from CAMAG, a Switzerland based company. It provides automated sample 
application (loading), plate development, detection and documentation.

References
Notes

Sources
 Puri, A., Ahmad, A. and Panda, B. P. (2010), Development of an HPTLC-based diagnostic method for invasive aspergillosis. Biomed. Chromatogr., 24: 887–892. doi: 10.1002/bmc.1382 
 Ajaz Ahmad, M Mujeeb, Bibhu Prasad Panda (2010) An HPTLC Method for the Simultaneous Analysis of Compactin and Citrinin in Penicillium citrinum Fermentation Broth. Journal of Planar Chromatography-modern TLC 23 (4), 282–285

Bibliography

 F. Geiss (1987): Fundamentals of thin layer chromatography planar chromatography, Heidelberg, Hüthig, 
 Jork, H., Funk, W., Fischer, W., Wimmer, H. (1990): Thin-Layer Chromatography: Reagents and Detection Methods, Volume 1a, VCH, Weinheim, 
 Jork, H., Funk, W., Fischer, W., Wimmer, H. (1994): Thin-Layer Chromatography: Reagents and Detection Methods, Volume 1b, VCH, Weinheim 
 Hahn-Deinstorp, E. (2000): Applied Thin-Layer Chromatography. Best Practice and Avoidance of Mistakes, Wiley-VCH, Weinheim, 
 Spangenberg, B., Poole, C. F., Weins, C. (2011): Quantitative Thin-Layer Chromatography : A Practical Survey, Springer, Berlin, Heidelberg
 Zlatkis, A., Kaiser, RE. (editors), (1977): HPTLC : high performance thin-layer chromatography, Amsterdam, Elsevier  
 Reich A., Schibli A. (2006): High Performance Thin-Layer Chromatography for the Analysis of Medicinal Plants, Thieme, New York, Stuttgart, 
 Sethi, P. D. (2011): Sethi's HPTLC, High Performance Thin Layer Chromatography. Content Uniformity of Pharmaceutical Formulations. Kongposh Publications, New Delhi, 
 Gupta, A. K., Tandon, N., Sharma, M. (2003–2012): Quality Standards of Indian Medicinal Plants, volume 1–10,ICMR, New Delhi, 
 Jaiswal, P.K. (2010): High Performance Thin Layer Chromatography in Food Analysis, CBS Publisher & Distributors, New Delhi, 
 Waksmundzka-Hajnos, M., Sherma, J., Kowalska, T. (2008): Thin Layer Chromatography in Phytochemistry, CRC Press (Taylor & Francis Group), Boca Raton, 
 Touchstone, J. C. (1985): Techniques and Applications of Thin Layer Chromatography, John Wiley & Sons, Inc. New York, 9780471880172 
 Tandon, N. (2010) Phytochemical Reference Standards of Selected Indian Medicinal Plants, volume 1, ICMR, New Delhi,  
 Srivastava M. M. (2011) High Performance thin Layer Chromatography, Springer Verlag, Heidelberg, 
 Sethi P. D. (2013), Sethi's HPTLC, High Performance Thin Layer Chromatography. Quantitative Analysis of Pharmaceutical Formulations. Volumes 1–3, CBS Publishers & Distributors, New Delhi, India 

Chromatography